The Flint Generals were a professional hockey team in Flint, Michigan from 1969–1985. They were members of the International Hockey League and played their home games at the IMA Sports Arena. Their team colors were originally black and gold, but they were changed to royal blue, gold, and white. They were moved to Saginaw, Michigan after the 1985 season, becoming the Saginaw Generals. After the Generals departed Flint, they were replaced by the Flint Spirits.

Championships

Standings

Former players with NHL experience

 Doug Rombough 

 Rick Knickle 
 Ted Bulley
 Kirk Bowman
 Pierre Giroux
 Gilles Meloche

External links
 HockeyDB.com page

Defunct ice hockey teams in the United States
Edmonton Oilers minor league affiliates
International Hockey League (1945–2001) teams
Ice hockey clubs established in 1969
Sports clubs disestablished in 1985
Professional ice hockey teams in Michigan
Ice hockey teams in Flint, Michigan
Philadelphia Flyers minor league affiliates
Ice hockey teams in Michigan
1969 establishments in Michigan
1985 disestablishments in Michigan
Boston Bruins minor league affiliates